Lee Se-hee (born  on December 22, 1991) is a South Korean actress. She made her acting debut in 2015 with a music video  "364 Days of Dream", since then, she has appeared in number of films and television series. She got recognition for portraying role of Park Dan-dan in weekend TV series Young Lady and Gentleman (2021–2022) for which she won the best new actress award at 2021 KBS Drama Awards. She has acted in films as: Midnight Runners (2017)  and Midnight (2021) among others. In 2020 she appeared in JTBC TV series Live On.

In 2022 she won the 'Popularity Award (actress)' at 2022 KBS Drama Awards for her performance in the series Bad Prosecutor.

Career
Lee is affiliated to artist management company Family Entertainment. She was in dental hygiene when she changed her career to acting.

Lee debuted in Na Yoon-kwon's music video in 2015, and was cast in web series Sandwich Theory, Kiss Scene in Yeonnam-dong and Kiss Goblin  in 2019. In 2020 she was in supporting cast of KakaoTV's Love Revolution, and appeared in MBC 'Cinematic Drama SF8 - White Crow.

In 2021, Lee appeared in season 2 of Hospital Playlist as Kang So-ye, first-year fellow in the Department of Emergency Medicine and she  appeared as female lead in KBS's weekend family drama Young Lady and Gentleman. Her portrayal of Park Dan-dan, a resident tutor was appreciated. She got the role, breaking through the 500:1 competition and being termed as one of the 'discovery of the year'. The series currently ranks at the 3rd place among 'Top 50 series per nationwide viewers in Korea' and logged a national average viewership of 38.2% for its 48th episode. She also won the Best New Actress award and best couple award with Ji Hyun-woo at 2021 KBS Drama Awards for her role in the series.

In 2022, after success of her weekend drama, KBS cast her in their upcoming TV series Bad Prosecutor as Shin A-ra, a senior prosecutor at the Central District Prosecutors' Office. In November 2022, Lee signed an exclusive contract with J-Wide Company.  In the same year, she won the Best Couple Award with Doh Kyung-soo and 'Popularity Award (actress)' at 2022 KBS Drama Awards for her performance in the series Bad Prosecutor.

Modeling 
In September 2021, Lee was selected by Ed Hardy as a brand model with the launch of the golf wear line, and Liful Minimal Garments selected her as their brand muse. In October 2021, she was selected as model for global denim brand 'Siwy'.

Filmography

Films

Television series

Web series

Music video appearances

Awards and nominations

Listicles

References

External links
  
 
 Lee Se-hee on Daum 

21st-century South Korean actresses
South Korean film actresses
South Korean television actresses
Living people
1991 births
South Korean web series actresses
Hwasan Lee clan